Nils Anton Alfhild Asther (17 January 1897 – 19 October 1981) was a Swedish actor active in Hollywood from 1926 to the mid-1950s, known as "the male Greta Garbo". Between 1916 and 1963 he appeared in over seventy feature films, sixteen of which were produced in the silent era.  He is mainly remembered today for two silent films – The Single Standard and Wild Orchids – he made with fellow Swede Greta Garbo, and his portrayal of the title character in the controversial pre-Code Frank Capra film The Bitter Tea of General Yen.

Biography
Asther, born Nils Anton Alfhild Asther, was the son of Swedish nationals Anton Andersson Asther (born February 21, 1865, Caroli, Malmö) and Hildegard Augusta Åkerlund (born November 3, 1869, in Södra Sallerup, Malmöhus County). Although Anton Andersson Asther had promised Hildagard Augusta Åkerlund aka Hilda Åkerlund marriage, she however was unwed when she gave birth to Nils in Sankt Matthæus parish in the Copenhagen borough of Vesterbro where she stayed very briefly. Thus, due to the marriage promise, technically, Nils was not an illegitimate child. (Also: when the parents married, a note was made of Anton´s official acknowledgement of the boy.)

He spent his first year as a foster child in Hyllie, Sweden with saddlemaker Rasmus Hellström and wife Emilia Kristina Möller. He was christened in Hyllie on February 26, 1897, before moving in with his biological parents who had married on May 29, 1898, in Malmö.

His half-brother Gunnar Anton Asther (born March 4, 1892, in Caroli, Malmö) was his father's child from a previous marriage to Anna Paulina Olander, who had died in July 1895.

As a young man Asther moved to Stockholm, where he received acting lessons from Augusta Lindberg. It was through Lindberg that Asther received his first theatrical engagement at Lorensbergsteatern in Gothenburg, and in 1916 Mauritz Stiller cast him in The Wings (Swedish: Vingarna), a gay-themed Swedish silent film from 1916, directed by Mauritz Stiller, based on Herman Bang's 1902 novel Mikaël. In Copenhagen, actor Aage Hertel of the Royal Danish Theatre took Asther under his wing. This soon led to a number of film roles in Sweden, Denmark and Germany between 1918 and 1926.

Hollywood
In 1927, Asther left for Hollywood, where his first film was Topsy and Eva. By 1928 his good looks had made him into a leading man, playing opposite such stars as Pola Negri, Marion Davies and Joan Crawford. He grew a thin mustache which amplified his suave appearance.
One of his most popular films was Our Dancing Daughters, starring Joan Crawford, Johnny Mack Brown, Anita Page, and Dorothy Sebastian. Asther was cast opposite Greta Garbo in Wild Orchids as the tempting Javanese Prince De Gace.  With the arrival of sound in movies, Asther took diction and voice lessons to minimize his accent, and was generally cast in roles where an accent was not a problem, such as the Chinese General Yen in The Bitter Tea of General Yen.

Career decline
Between 1935 and 1940, Asther was forced to work in England after an alleged breach of contract led to a studio-based blacklist.  Asther made six films there. He returned to Hollywood in 1940, and although he made another 19 films up until 1949, his career was never the same, and he appeared mostly in small supporting roles. In the early 1950s, Asther tried to restart his career in television, but managed only to secure roles in a few episodes of minor TV series.
In 1958, he returned to Sweden, almost destitute. There he managed to get an engagement with a local theater and had four film roles before finally giving up on acting in 1963 and devoting his time to painting.

Homosexuality
Asther was a homosexual in a time when it was a dangerous social stigma, both personally and professionally. He grew up in a deeply religious Lutheran home, believing homosexuality was a sin and society viewed homosexuality as a disease. In Sweden it was called "unnatural fornication". While sexual relations between adults of the same sex were legalized in 1944, the medical classification of homosexuality as a form of mental disorder continued until 1979.

The theatrical community and the film industry in the 1920s accepted gay actors with little reservation, always provided they remained discreet about their sexual orientation and there was no public suggestion of impropriety. Asther was closeted.  He proposed marriage to Greta Garbo to hide the true nature of his sexual orientation.  Asther and Garbo had known each other in Sweden, and finding themselves relatively new to a foreign land they spent a great deal of time together.  They often visited a friend's ranch outside Hollywood where they could relax, ride horses, go climbing, or swim at Lake Arrowhead. "Sailor" was a favored term for Greta Garbo's male, gay/bisexual friends. In 1929 during filming on location in Catalina The Single Standard with Nils Asther, she was overheard berating the actor for grabbing her so roughly. "I'm not one of your sailors," she reminded him.

Rumors exist from the early 1930s that Nils had relationships with Swedish director Mauritz Stiller and Swedish writer Hjalmar Bergman and with other male colleagues. Asther mentions some of this in his memoirs. He had a long-term relationship with actor/stuntman and World War II Navy sailor Ken DuMain. According to Ken DuMain, he met Asther on Hollywood Boulevard in the early 1940s, and they enjoyed a long-term relationship.

In August 1930, Nils entered a lavender marriage with Vivian Duncan, one of his Topsy and Eva co-stars. They had one child, Evelyn Asther Duncan, nicknamed in the media as "the international Baby" due to her Swedish father, American mother, and Bavarian birth. Their daughter's nationality was debated, and Asther offered to apply for American citizenship if it would help the process of getting their daughter into America. Right from the start, Asther and Duncan's marriage proved stormy and became fodder for the tabloids. They divorced in 1932.

Memoirs
Asther's memoir was published posthumously in Swedish. The book was put together with a foreword by theatre historian Uno "Myggan" Ericson, who had met Asther only once, when he arrived in Gothenburg in 1958. The afterword was written by Iwo Wiklander. The middle of the book, written by Asther, covers the years between his birth and his return to Sweden in 1958. Iwo Wiklander claimed in later interviews that Nils Asther was intent on erasing parts of his life before his death, and that much material in his autobiography was exaggerated – or completely made up – to make a more interesting story. Countess Linde Klinckowström-von Rosen claimed their "engagement" was a practical joke while filming together. She did however, introduce Nils to her family, and to the Swedish painter Nils Dardel and his freethinking artistic circle.

Death and legacy
Nils Asther died on October 13, 1981, at a hospital in Farsta, Stockholm. He is buried in Hotagen, Jämtland.

In 1960, Asther was inducted into the Hollywood Walk of Fame with a motion pictures star at 6705 Hollywood Boulevard for his contributions to the film industry.

Selected filmography

 The Wings (1916) – Aspiring actor
 Hittebarnet (1917, Short) – Kurt
 Retten sejrer (1918)
 A Trip to Mars (1918) – Wounded Martian Citizen (uncredited)
 Solen der dræbte (1918) – Jan
 Gyurkovicsarna (1920) – Bandi Gyurkovics
 Vem dömer (1922) – Apprentice
 The Secret of the Duchess (1923)
 Norrtullsligan (1923) – Baby's Fiancé
Charles XII's Courier (1924) – Stanislaus
 Wienerbarnet (1924) – Charles Dupont
 Letters Which Never Reached Him (1925)
 Love's Finale (1925) – Dr. Gaston Lasar
 Her Husband's Wife (1926)
 Three Cuckoo Clocks (1926) – Reginald Ellis
 The Golden Butterfly (1926) – Andy, sein Sohn
 Das süße Mädel (1926) – The Prince's Son
 Wrath of the Seas (1926) – Torpedooffizier Günther Adenried
 The Man with the Counterfeit Money (1927)
 Gauner im Frack (1927) – George Valeska
 Hotelratten (1927) – Fürst Ladrone
 Topsy and Eva (1927) – George Shelby
 Sorrell and Son (1927) – Christopher 'Kit' Sorrell
 The Blue Danube (1928) – Erich von Statzen
 Laugh, Clown, Laugh (1928) – Luigi
 The Cossacks (1928) – Prince Olenin Stieshneff
 Loves of an Actress (1928) – Raoul
 The Cardboard Lover (1928) – Andre
 Our Dancing Daughters (1928) – Norman
 Dream of Love (1928) – Prince Maurice de Saxe
 Wild Orchids (1929)  – Prince De Gace
 The Hollywood Revue of 1929 (1929) – Nils Asther (scenes deleted)
 The Single Standard (1929) – Packy Cannon
 The Sea Bat (1930) – Carl
 But the Flesh Is Weak (1932) – Prince Paul
 Letty Lynton (1932) – Emile Renaul
 The Washington Masquerade (1932) – Brenner
 The Bitter Tea of General Yen (1932) – Gen. Yen
 Storm at Daybreak (1933) – Captain Geza Petery
 The Right to Romance (1933) – Dr. Helmuth Heppling
 If I Were Free (1933) – Tono Cazenove
 By Candlelight (1933) – Prince Alfred von Rommer
 Madame Spy (1934) – Captain Franck
 The Crime Doctor (1934) – Gary Patten
 The Love Captive (1934) – Dr. Alexis Collender
 Love Time (1934) – Franz Schubert
 Abdul the Damned (1935) – Chief of Police Kadar-Pasha
 The Prisoner of Corbal (1936) – Varennes
 Guilty Melody (1936) – Galloni
 Make-Up (1937) – Bux
 Tea Leaves in the Wind (1938) – Tony Drake
 The Man Who Lost Himself (1941) – Peter Ransome
 Forced Landing (1941) – Colonel Jan Golas
 Dr. Kildare's Wedding Day (1941) – Constanzo Labardi
 Flying Blind (1941) – Eric Karolek
 The Night of January 16th (1941) – Bjorn Faulkner
 The Night Before the Divorce (1942) – Victor Roselle
 Sweater Girl (1942) – Prof. Henri Menard
 Night Monster (1942) – Agor Singh
 Submarine Alert (1943) – Dr. Arthur Huneker
 Mystery Broadcast (1943) – Ricky Moreno
 The Hour Before the Dawn (1944) – Kurt van der Breughel
 Bluebeard (1944) – Inspector Jacques Lefevre
 Alaska (1944) – Thomas Leroux
 The Man in Half Moon Street (1945) – Dr. Julian Karell
 Son of Lassie (1945) – Olav
 Jealousy (1945) – Peter Urban
 Love, Honor and Goodbye (1945) – Tony Linnard
 The Feathered Serpent (1948) – Prof. Paul Evans
 Samson and Delilah (1949) – Prince (uncredited)
 That Man from Tangier (1953) – Henri
 When Darkness Falls (1960) – Tord Ekstedt, Vicar
 Svenska Floyd (1961) – Vincent Mitella
 The Lady in White (1962) – Simon Ek
 Suddenly, a Woman! (1963) – Londonchefen (final film role)

On soundtracks
 Dr. Kildare's Wedding Day (1941) as uncredited performer: "Ride of the Valkyries" and "Tableau Russe"" (Symphonic Suite Composed by Lionel Barrymore)
 Storm at Daybreak (1933) as performer: "Roses from the South"

Selected stage
 The Importance of Being Earnest; director: Gustaf Linden, premiere: 1923-02-27, Royal Dramatic Theatre, Stockholm
 The Admirable Crichton; director: Karl Hedberg, premiere: 1923-10-12 Royal Dramatic Theatre, Stockholm
 Othello; director: Olof Molander, premiere: 1924-02-08 Royal Dramatic Theatre, Stockholm
 The Strong Are Lonely; director: Margaret Webster, premiere: 1924-09-29 Broadhurst Theatre, New York

References

External links

 
 Ritt genom livet. Linde Klinckowström-von Rosen, Stockholm: Hökerberg. 1962. Libris 1240991
 
 
 
 Nils Asther at Virtual History

Swedish male silent film actors
20th-century Swedish male actors
Swedish gay actors
Swedish male film actors
Swedish male television actors
Male actors from Copenhagen
Male actors from Stockholm
Swedish expatriates in the United States
Expatriate male actors in the United States
1897 births
1981 deaths
20th-century Swedish LGBT people